The MV Manx Viking / Nindawayma was a passenger, truck and car ferry, whose last active service was on Lake Huron, operated by the Owen Sound Transportation Company; under contract to the Ontario Ministry of Transportation. In Canadian service she served the Highway 6 route between Tobermory and South Baymouth, Manitoulin Island from 1989 to 1992 alongside the MS Chi-Cheemaun.

Service history
One of three sister ships, she was launched on 19 August 1974 as the Monte Cruceta at the "S. A. Juliana Gijonesa" shipyard in Gijón, Spain, for the Spanish shipping line Naviera Aznar. The vessels were built as long-distance multi-purpose roll-on/roll-off (RORO) ferries, handling both cargo and passengers, with fully refrigerated vehicle decks. Outfitting delays postponed her maiden voyage until 1976, by which time she had been renamed as Monte Castillo. The ships ran a summer service in the Mediterranean, and in the winter carried fruit and vegetables across the Bay of Biscay to Liverpool and Newhaven from Spain and the Balearic Islands

By 1977, the service across the Bay of Biscay for which they were built had ceased, the ships were sold: Monte Castillo was sold to Manx Line (later Sealink-Manx Line) and renamed Manx Viking for service between Heysham, England and Douglas, Isle of Man. Following a controversial reverse takeover in 1986 by the Isle of Man Steam Packet company, she worked a season painted in Steam Packet livery, initially alongside the Mona's Isle (ex-Free Enterprise III) followed by Antrim Princess (subsequently renamed Tynwald) before Manx Viking'''s lease was terminated and she was returned to her owners (the parent Sealink company, by now part of Sea Containers, who had actually funded the takeover). In 1987, she was briefly renamed Manx for the delivery voyage to new Norwegian owners Det Stavangerske Dampskibsselskap, for whom she sailed in service under the name Skudenes. The ship was sold again in 1989, into service with the Government of Ontario. She was renamed Ontario No.1 for the Atlantic crossing before her final renaming as MS Nindawayma.Her sisters were sold to Trasmediterranea for Mediterranean service.

Manx service
During her days as the Manx Viking, she served on the Heysham-Douglas service of Sealink-Manx Line. The ship was the first RORO ferry on Manx routes, and the first there to carry both freight and passenger traffic being suitable for cars, commercial trucks and trailers. She was fitted with numerous motorcycle stands to allow for Isle of Man TT and Manx Grand Prix traffic. As built, the ship had cranes for self-loading of containers onto the afterdeck; these were unused by Manx Line. Manx Line added a bow door and visor, along with extra lifeboats; becoming the only passenger ship in Manx waters with lifeboat accommodation for all aboard. She was also the first ferry in Manx waters to have inside accommodation for all passengers. At the time her 450 tonne fuel capacity gave her the longest range of any ferry in British waters: she was theoretically capable of travelling from Heysham to Port Stanley in the Falkland Islands without refuelling. She was considered for Falklands duty, but not used.

During Manx service she enjoyed an unrivalled reputation for reliability with passengers and was able to put to sea in weather conditions which forced her competitors to remain in port.  Her arrival created a marked change in Manx traffic flows eventually resulting in the financial collapse of the rival Isle of Man Steam Packet Company, and the Steam Packet's subsequent amalgamation with Sealink-Manx Line.

She initially carried the white and blue livery of Manx Line, but after this company ran into financial difficulties and was taken over by British Rail-Sealink, she received the BR corporate monastral blue hull, white upperworks and red funnel.

She differed from other Sealink ships in carrying a gold-coloured sculpted "three legs of man" on her funnels rather than the standard BR double chevron. Later, publicity images were released of her painted in the Sea Containers era Sealink livery of white hull with blue trim, but these were mockups and the colours never applied. Due to problems with ship availability she was recalled hurriedly from dry dock before the paint job was completed, with just the new blue boot-topping applied. After the Steam Packet takeover her unwashed blue hull was given a rough overpaint of black, retaining the BR red funnels (rather than the differently-hued Steam Packet red). Following the takeover, the crew persisted in flying the Manx Line house pennant, rather than the management-mandated Steam Packet one. Later as a continued sign of protest against the takeover the crew changed this to half of a Manx Line pennant.

It was initially intended that she would be retired from Manx service following the amalgamation of Sealink-Manx Line and The Steam Packet. Services would be concentrated on the Heysham-Douglas route with a strengthened two-ship service using the larger Mona's Isle (VI) and Antrim Princess. After over 150 years of uninterrupted service, the Steam Packet's year-round Liverpool-Douglas services were to be abandoned. In the event, trade union problems delayed the transfer of Antrim Princess from Stranraer, while Mona's Isle proved unserviceable. Instead Mona's Isle was withdrawn after six months and Manx Viking remained for another season. Manx Viking was eventually replaced by the cargo-only roll-on/roll-off vessel  leaving - the by now renamed - Tynwald (VI) as the only passenger vessel on the route. In so doing the combined company avoided an expensive charter as the otherwise surplus Peveril was owned by the Steam Packet, not leased and had just been released from charter on the Heysham-Belfast route. The changes in manning brought about by the Manx Viking withdrawal, and Peverils route transfer were some of the centres of dispute of the 1980s British national seamen's strikes.

If Manx Viking had been withdrawn as originally intended, she would have been transferred to Weymouth, Dorset and renamed Earl Henry for service on the route to Cherbourg. This never took place due to the delayed availability of the Antrim Princess.

Norwegian service
Following Manx Viking’s sale to Det Stavangerske Dampskibsselskap, she was reported to have developed severe engine problems, in so doing creating financial difficulties for her owners. She was sold on after only one year. This may have been a recurrence of the crankshaft problems she has been reported to have suffered while in Sealink-Manx Line service.

Canadian service
MS Nindawayma’s decommissioning from Canadian service after four years of use is said to have been due to "unsatisfactory performance". There was a distinct smell of diesel fuel at deck level, possibly due to her low-set twin funnels. (Photos of her in Canadian service show that the funnel-top smoke deflectors had been removed.) Her French Pielstick diesel engines were apparently troublesome, and sailings were canceled due to mechanical problems. Her bow and stern doors were claimed to not be high enough to accommodate semi-trailer trucks despite this not being a problem in Manx or Spanish service. These factors caused significant numbers of ferry passengers to avoid the MS Nindawayma in favour of the MS Chi-Cheemaun, even if waiting involved very long delays at the ferry terminals in Tobermory and South Baymouth.

Final use
The Nindawayma was used as two movie sets; featured in 2003 as the Belles' loft on water in the film Saved by the Belles, and in 2006 as the killer's lair in the film Bon Cop, Bad Cop. As of April 2007, Nindawayma was docked in a port in Montreal, rusting and being used for parts.

Fate
As of 17 August 2007, the ship was owned by Purvis Marine, a marine salvage company, and docked at a government wharf in Sault Ste. Marie, Ontario, Canada. The ship was broken up for scrap at Sault Ste Marie by Purvis Marine between 2007 and 2012, with the scrap metal being sold to the local Essar Steel Algoma steelworks.

Photo gallery

Bibliography
  (A detailed history of the ship's service with Manx Line and Sealink.'')

References

External links

 Photos and article from SooToday.com
 Commentary and photos of Nindawayma from a British perspective
 Comments on engine problems while in service with DSD and Sealink
 Canadian Registry details are on these two official websites, giving conflicting details of her tonnage:
 Canadian Transportation agency
 Transport Canada marine safety site

Ships of the Isle of Man Steam Packet Company
Ferries of the Owen Sound Transportation Company
Transport in Manitoulin District
Ferries of the Isle of Man
1974 ships
Ships built in Spain